Daniel Fallins (born 12 August 1996) is an Australian cricketer. He made his List A debut for Cricket Australia XI in the 2017–18 JLT One-Day Cup on 13 October 2017. He made his first-class debut for Cricket Australia XI against England on 8 November 2017 in a tour match prior to the 2017–18 Ashes series. He made his Twenty20 debut for the Melbourne Stars in BBL07 on 12 January 2018.

Domestic career
Fallins was in the Cricket Australia XI squad for the 2017–18 JLT One-Day Cup. He played two matches, bowling only 11 overs and taking just one wicket.

References

External links
 

1996 births
Living people
Australian cricketers
Place of birth missing (living people)
Cricket Australia XI cricketers
Melbourne Stars cricketers